Derck de Vilder (born 23 November 1998) is a Dutch field hockey player who plays as a defender or midfielder for Hoofdklasse club Kampong and the Dutch national team.

Career

Club hockey
In the Dutch Hoofdklasse, De Vilder plays for SV Kampong.

National teams

Under–21
De Vilder made his debut for the Netherlands U–21 team in 2017 during a test series against Germany in Mönchengladbach. Later that year he won a gold medal with the team at the EuroHockey Junior Championship in Valencia, Spain.

In 2019, two years after his debut, De Vilder returned to the junior national team during an eight-nations tournament in Madrid. He went on to represent the team at another EuroHockey Junior Championship later that year, on this occasion winning a bronze medal.

Oranje
Derck de Vilder made his senior debut for the Oranje in 2018 during a test series against Australia in Perth.

He has since gone on to make a number of appearances for the national team, before being named in the official squad for the first time in 2022.

References

External links
 
 

1998 births
Living people
Dutch male field hockey players
Male field hockey defenders
Male field hockey midfielders
SV Kampong players
Men's Hoofdklasse Hockey players
Field hockey players from Amsterdam
2023 Men's FIH Hockey World Cup players
21st-century Dutch people